The 2011 Pan American Race Walking Cup was held in Envigado, Antioquia, Colombia on 26–27 March.  The track of the Cup runs in the Avenida Las Vegas, Barrio Primavera.

Complete results were published.

Medallists

Results

Men's 20 km

Team

Men's 50 km

Team

Men's 10 km (Junior)

Team

Women's 20 km

Team

Women's 10 km (Junior)

Team

Participation
The participation of 123 athletes from 17 countries is reported.

 (5)
 (13)
 (1)
 (3)
 (16)
 (4)
 (1)
 (1)
 (18)
 (3)
 (4)
 México (18)
 Panamá (2)
 Perú (5)
 (3)
 (13)
 (6)

See also
 2011 Race Walking Year Ranking

References

Pan American Race Walking Cup
Pan American Race Walking Cup
Pan American Race Walking Cup
International athletics competitions hosted by Colombia